Dimitrios Serelis (born 5 May 1980) is a retired Greek athlete who specialised in the long jump. He represented his country at two Olympic Games, in 2000 and 2004, failing to register a valid mark on both occasions.

His personal bests in the event are 8.21 metres outdoor (+1.4 m/s, Athens 2003) and 8.08 metres (Piraeus 2000).

Competition record

References

1980 births
Living people
Greek male long jumpers
Athletes (track and field) at the 2000 Summer Olympics
Athletes (track and field) at the 2004 Summer Olympics
Olympic athletes of Greece